Elena Dementieva was the defending champion, but chose not to participate this year.

In the final, Yanina Wickmayer defeated Flavia Pennetta, 6–3, 6–2.

Seeds

  Flavia Pennetta (final)
  Li Na (first round)
  Yanina Wickmayer (champion)
  Francesca Schiavone (semifinals)
  Virginie Razzano (second round)
  Elena Vesnina (second round)
  Aravane Rezaï (second round)
  Anabel Medina Garrigues (first round)

Draw

Finals

Top half

Bottom half

External links
Main Draw
Qualifying Draw

WTA Auckland Open
2010 WTA Tour